The 12 Metre was a sailing event on the Sailing at the 1908 Summer Olympics program in Hunters Quay.  Three races were scheduled. Each nation could enter up to 2 boats. 20 sailors, on 2 boats, from 1 nation competed.

Race schedule

Course area  
The following course was used during the 1908 Olympic 12-Metre regattas in all two races:
 Start at Hunter's Quay
 Buoy at Inverkip
 Buoy at Dunoon
 Buoy at Kilcreggan
 Back to Hunter's Quay

Weather conditions

Final results 
The 1908 Olympic scoring system was used. All competitors were male For first place the helmsman and mate of the Hera received gold medals but the crew received silver medals. For second place the helmsman and mate of the Mouchette received silver medals but the crew received bronze medals.

Other information

Extra awards 
 Gilt commemorative medal:
 T. C. Glen-Coats, owner of Hera
 Silver commemorative medal:
 C. MacIver, owner of Mouchette

Further reading

References 

 

12 Metre
12-metre class